Gorbunovo (Korbo-Tal) is a rural locality (a selo) and the administrative centre of Gorbunovskoye Rural Settlement, Ust-Koksinsky District, the Altai Republic, Russia. The population was 296 as of 2016. There are 7 streets.

Geography 
Gorbunovo is located 18 km southeast of Ust-Koksa (the district's administrative centre) by road. Tikhonkaya is the nearest rural locality.

References 

Rural localities in Ust-Koksinsky District